"Flowers of Edinburgh" is a traditional fiddle tune, of eighteenth century Scottish lineage. It is also prominent in American fiddle, Canadian fiddle and wherever old time fiddle is cultivated. The tune is also the basis for a Morris Dance, in the Bledington style.

History
According to a self-deprecating secondary report in A Native's Guide to Edinburgh by Tom Mc Rae, the stench from the loch permeated the old city and probably gave rise to the traditional tune "The Flowers of Edinburgh." There are several possible explanations for the title, some given in a 2011 blogspot for "gdaeblogspot". The author suggests the author was the publisher James Oswald. The "Traditional Tune Archives" website gives an earlier date of c 1737 by John Walsh in "Caledonian Country Dances Vol 2".

In America, William Rebbeck published a version of the dance in 1788.

A piper of the Royal Regiment of Scotland played "Flowers of Edinburgh" while the Duke of Edinburgh's coffin was lowered into the vault at Windsor.

Technical
G Major (one sharp)

Recordings
A few of the many notable recordings of a tune by this name:
50 Fiddle Solos by Aly Bain
Rogha Scoil Samhraidh Willie Clancy 2007 by Various Artists
Shetland Fiddle Music by School of Scottish Studies, University of Edinburgh
The Cat That Ate The Candle by John Carty and Brian McGrath
 The Fiddlesticks Collection by Jerry Holland

Other names
Blata Duin-Eudain, Knuckle Down, My Love was Once a Bonnie Lad, My Love's Bonny When She Smiles on Me, To the Battle Men of Erin, The Weobley Hankie Dance, The Weobley Hanky Dance.

Bibliography
Captain Simon Fraser's Airs and Melodies Peculiar to the Highlands of Scotland (1816)
It is also included in Cecil Sharp's "Country Dance Tunes" (1922)

See also
The Flouers o Edinburgh (play set in Edinburgh by Robert McLellan)
List of Scottish country dances
Scottish fiddle
Music of Ireland
Music of Scotland
Old Time Fiddle

Videographic documentation
 Proper performance Ashley MacIsaac's February 20, 2010 concert in Victoria, with guests Qristina & Quinn Bachand. Also featuring Bryan Skinner on bodhran and Jason King on whistle.
 Sometimes played in D Major. Title: Flowers of Edinburgh & Spootiskerry – Ashley MacIsaac & The Bachands.
 Dance tune. Lopez Island 2008

References

American folk songs
Celtic music
Fiddle music
Shetland music